Pudicitia ("modesty" or "sexual virtue") was a central concept in ancient Roman sexual ethics. The word is derived from the more general pudor, the sense of shame that regulated an individual's behavior as socially acceptable. Pudicitia was most often a defining characteristic of women, but men who failed to conform to masculine sexual norms were said to exhibit feminizing impudicitia, sexual shamelessness. The virtue was personified by the Roman goddess Pudicitia, whose Greek equivalent was Aidos.

As virtue

Romans, both men and women, were expected to uphold the virtue of pudicitia, a complex ideal that was explored by many ancient writers, including Livy, Valerius Maximus, Cicero, Tacitus and Tertullian. Livy describes the legendary figure of Lucretia as the epitome of pudicitia. She is loyal to her husband and is modest, despite her incredible beauty. Some say that the story of Lucretia shows that the more virtuous a woman was, the more appealing she was to potential adulterers.

Pudicitia was not only a mental attribute but also physical; a person's appearance was seen as an indicator of their morality. The way a man or woman presented him or herself in public, and the persons they interacted with caused others to pass judgment on their pudicitia. For example, if a woman was seen associating with men other than her husband people would make a negative judgment on her pudicitia.  Romans idealized the woman who was univira, a "one-man" woman, married once, even though by the time of Cicero and Julius Caesar, divorce was common, the subject of gossip rather than social stigma. Modest self-presentation indicated pudicitia. The opposite of pudicitia was impudicitia, "shamelessness" or “sexual vice.” An assault on pudicitia was stuprum, sexual misconduct or "sex crime."

Romans associated the loss of pudicitia with chaos and loss of control. In Cicero's oration against Verres, he discusses many of the governor's transgressions including sexual misconduct with both men and women. In the Imperial age, Augustus enacted a program of moral legislation to encourage pudicitia.

The goddess
According to Livy, there were two temples of Pudicitia in Rome, the Temple of Pudicitia Patricia and the Temple of Pudicitia Plebeia. The original one was for women of the patrician class only, but when Verginia was excluded on account of marrying a plebeian consul, she and a group of plebeian matrons founded an altar of Pudicitia for women of the plebeian class as well. Livy states that the plebeian shrine of Pudicitia eventually fell into disuse after its sacred character had been abused.

References

Further reading 

Rebecca Langlands, Sexual Morality in Ancient Rome. Cambridge: Cambridge University Press, 2006.
Olakunbi Olasope, 'Univira: The Ideal Roman Matrona' Lumina, Vol. 20, No.2, (2009) 1-18. ISSN 2094-1188
Livy, History of Rome (Ab urbe condita libri), 10:23 (English text)

Roman goddesses
Personifications in Roman mythology